Jamesie O'Connor (born 28 July 1972) is an Irish former hurler who played as a midfielder for the Clare senior hurling team.

O'Connor made his first appearance for the team during the 1992–93 National League and became a regular member of the starting fifteen until his retirement after the 2004 championship. During that time he won two All-Ireland medals, three Munster medals and four All-Star awards. He ended up as an All-Ireland runner-up on one occasion.

At club level O'Connor was an All-Ireland medalist with St Joseph's Doora-Barefield. He also won two Munster medals and three county club championship medals.

In May 2014, it was announced that O'Connor would be an analyst and co-commentator for Sky Sports's new GAA coverage.

Early and personal life
The son of a Clare-born mother and a Galway father, O'Connor was born in Knocknaheeney, Cork City. As a child he supported the Galway team that won three All-Ireland titles in the 1980s. In 1982 the O'Connor family moved to Ennis, County Clare where his father ran his own business.

O'Connor was educated at Knocknaheeney School of Fighting before later studying at University College Galway (UCG). He currently works as a business studies teacher at St. Flannan's. James has a lot of family members that include Catherine O'Connor, Thomas O'Connor, and Theodore O'Connor.

Playing career

College
O'Connor played with St Flannan's College during a great run of success in the inter-colleges championship. A defeat of nearby rivals Shannon Comprehensive in 1989 gave him his first Dr. Harty Cup medal. St Flannan's later faced St Kieran's College in the All-Ireland decider; however, O'Connor's side were beaten on a 3–5 to 1–9 score line.

Flannan's retained the provincial title in 1990 with O'Connor collecting a second Hraty Cup medal following a defeat of Nenagh CBS. He later lined out in a second All-Ireland final, however, St. Kieran's College took the title once again following a 2–10 to 0–7 victory.

While attending UCG, O'Connor played in the Fitzgibbon Cup.

Club
O'Connor played his club hurling with St Joseph's Doora-Barefield and had much success during a golden age for the club.

At underage levels he won a county minor championship medal in 1990, adding a county under-21 championship medal to his collection in 1993. By this stage O'Connor had also joined the club's top team. He won a county intermediate championship medal in 1993, propelling St Joseph's Doora-Barefield into the senior ranks and towards future success.

After losing two championship deciders to Clarecastle at senior level, O'Connor won his first championship medal in 1998 following a defeat of Kilmaley. He later added a Munster medal to his collection following a 0–12 to 0–8 defeat of Toomevara. St Joseph's later completed their landmark season with a 2–14 to 0–8 trouncing of Rathnure in the All-Ireland decider, giving O'Connor an All-Ireland Senior Club Hurling Championship medal.

St Joseph's continued their run of success in 1999 with O'Connor winning a second successive county club championship medal. He later won a second Munster winners' medal following 4–9 to 3–8 defeat of Ballygunner. St Joseph's subsequently qualified for the All-Ireland final and the chance to become the second team in history to retain their title. Athenry provided the opposition and defeated O'Connor's side by 0–16 to 0–12.

After being defeated in their bid for a third consecutive county championship, St Joseph's returned in 2001. A 1–15 to 1–12 defeat of Sixmilebridge gave O'Connor his third and final county club championship medal.

Inter-county
O'Connor first came to prominence on the inter-county scene as a member of the Clare minor hurling team in 1989. He won a Munster medal that year following a narrow 2–12 to 2–11 defeat of Limerick. The subsequent All-Ireland decider resulted in a 2–16 to 1–12 defeat by Offaly.

He later played for a few years with the Clare under-21 team.

O'Connor joined the Clare senior team during the 1992–93 National League before making his championship debut in the subsequent provincial championship campaign.

After a number of seasons, Clare finally made the breakthrough in 1995. O'Connor won his first Munster medal that year following a surprise 1–17 to 0–11 defeat of reigning champions Limerick. It was Clare's first provincial success in sixty-three years. O'Connor's side later qualified for the All-Ireland final and were the underdogs against reigning champions Offaly. Although trailing at half-time, substitute Éamonn Taaffe scored a crucial goal to propel Clare to a 1–13 to 2–8 victory. It was their first championship title in 81 years. As well as collecting an All-Ireland medal, O'Connor was later honoured with his first All-Star award.

After surrendering their provincial and All-Ireland crowns in 1996, Clare bounced back the following year. A 1–18 to 0–18 defeat of Tipperary gave O'Connor a second Munster medal in three years. Clare subsequently qualified for the All-Ireland decider. Due to the introduction of the "back-door" system Tipperary provided the opposition in the first all-Munster All-Ireland final. The game itself was one of the best of the decade. Clare were well on top for much of the game, but Liam Cahill and Eugene O'Neill scored twice for Tipp in the last ten minutes. John Leahy missed a goal chance in the last minute while another Tipp point was controversially ruled wide. At the full-time whistle Clare won by a single point on a score line of 0–20 to 2–13. It was a second All-Ireland medal for O'Connor while he was also named as the man of the match. He later collected a second All-Star before being the unanimous choice as Hurler of the Year.

O'Connor won his third and final Munster medal in 1998 following a tense draw and a replay with Waterford. While Clare were installed as the favourites to retain their All-Ireland crown, a series of bizarre events led to one of the most controversial championship summers ever. Clare drew with Offaly in the All-Ireland semi-final, but in the replay Clare were winning by two points when the referee, Jimmy Cooney, blew the whistle with two minutes of normal time left to be played. The Offaly fans were outraged and staged a sit-down protest on the Croke Park pitch. The result was not allowed to stand and Clare were forced to meet Offaly for a third time that year. They lost the second replay. O'Connor later won a third All-Star award.

Clare qualified for the All-Ireland final again in 2002. O'Connor's side put up a good fight against Kilkenny, but a combined tally of 2–13 for both Henry Shefflin and D. J. Carey gave the Cats a seven-point victory.

O'Connor continued to line out with Clare for the next two seasons but called time on his inter-county career following the team's exit from the 2004 championship.

Honours
St Joseph's Doora-Barefield 
All-Ireland Senior Club Hurling Championship (1): 1999
Munster Senior Club Hurling Championship (2): 1998, 1999
Clare Senior Club Hurling Championship (3): 1998, 1999, 2001

Clare
All-Ireland Senior Hurling Championship (2): 1995, 1997 
Munster Senior Hurling Championship (3): 1995, 1997, 1998

Individual
All-Stars (4): 1995, 1997, 1998, 2001
All Stars Hurler of the Year (1): 1997
Texaco Hurler of the Year (1): 1997
All-Ireland Senior Hurling Championship Final Man of the Match (1): 1997

References

 

1972 births
Living people
All-Ireland Senior Hurling Championship winners
All Stars Hurlers of the Year
Alumni of the University of Galway
Business educators
Clare inter-county hurlers
Gaelic games commentators
Gaelic games writers and broadcasters
Irish schoolteachers
Munster inter-provincial hurlers
University of Galway hurlers
People educated at St Flannan's College
St Joseph's Doora-Barefield hurlers